Nandu Ram is an Indian sociologist and retired professor. He is the former dean of school of social sciences at the Jawaharlal Nehru University, New Delhi, and was one of the founding professors of the Dr. Ambedkar Chair in Sociology at JNU.

Books 
Ram has published more than three dozen research articles and is the author of three books. His major works are as follows:
 The Mobile Scheduled Castes: Rise of a New Middle Class (1988)
 Beyond Ambedkar: Essays on Dalits in India (1995)
 Ambedkar, Dalits and Buddhism, (ed.) Manak Publications, Delhi, 2008, Nandu Ram, CSSS.
 Dalits in Contemporary India, (ed.) Siddhant Publications, New Delhi, 2008, Nandu Ram, CSSS.
 Caste System and Untouchability in South India, Manak Publications, Delhi, 2008, Nandu Ram, CSSS.
 Encyclopedia of Scheduled Castes in India : In 5 Volumes.

References 

Year of birth missing (living people)
Living people
Indian sociologists